St Saviour's Cathedral was the home of the Anglican Diocese of Natal in Pietermaritzburg, South Africa from 1868 until its deconsecration in 1976: it was demolished in 1981.

References

Pietermaritzburg
Religious organizations established in 1868
Religious organizations disestablished in 1976
Churches in Pietermaritzburg
Deans of Maritzburg
Demolished buildings and structures in South Africa
Buildings and structures demolished in 1981